Frederick Debell Bennett (1806 - 1859) was an English ship surgeon and biologist. 

Born to a family of means in Devon, England. in 1806, he obtained his Licentiate of the Society of Apothecaries (L.S.A.) in 182, and his membership of the Royal College of Surgeons in 1829. Bennett first served as Assistant Surgeon on the hospital ship Grampus, which was moored on the Thames. Then in 1833, he joined the London whaleship Tuscan. From 1833-1836 he sailed round the globe on board the 'Tuscan'. The task of this journey was to study whales, lands and nature. He described several species, for example Whalesucker (Remora australis), blue noddy and Cheilopogon nigricans. He was also a member of the Royal Geographical Society. After his return he practiced medicine in Southwark where he died in 1859 at the age of fifty-three.

Book 
 Narrative of a Whaling Voyage Round the Globe, From the Year 1833 to 1836 (London, 1840)

References

External links
 Explorers of the Pacific: European and American Discoveries in Polynesia. Frederick Debell Bennett

Taxon authorities
Fellows of the Royal College of Surgeons
1806 births
1859 deaths